Jackson Gabriel Porozo Vernaza (born 4 August 2000) is an Ecuadorian professional footballer who plays as a centre-back for  club Troyes.

Club career

Early career
Born in San Lorenzo, Esmeraldas, Porozo started his career with LDU Quito, joining their youth setup in 2012. He subsequently represented Sandino FC, Manta and Independiente del Valle before returning to Manta in 2016. Porozo made his senior debut during the 2017 campaign, in the Ecuadorian Serie B. He scored his first senior goal on 22 April of that year, netting his team's only in a 3–1 away loss against Colón FC. Porozo finished his first season with one goal in 16 appearances, and also had a trial at Palmeiras in December 2017.

Santos
On 23 March 2018, Porozo agreed to a contract with Santos, being initially assigned to the under-20s. After having problems in his contract, he joined the club in August, after his 18th birthday.

Boavista
On 1 October 2020, Porozo was announced at Primeira Liga side Boavista, agreeing to a five-year contract, for a total fee of €500,000; Santos received 80% of the value, and also retained a 16% over a future sale.

Troyes
On 24 June 2022, Porozo signed for Ligue 1 side Troyes on a five-year contract.

International career
On 14 February 2017, Porozo was called up to Ecuador under-17s for the year's South American U-17 Championship, being a starter during the tournament and scoring a goal against Uruguay on 26 February. On 2 January 2019, he was included in Jorge Célico's 23-man list of the under-20s for the 2019 South American U-20 Championship.

Porozo was an undisputed starter during the competition, being included in the tournament's best eleven as his side was crowned champions. On 12 March 2019, he was called up to the full side for friendlies against United States and Honduras.

Porozo made his full international debut on 10 September 2019, coming on as a late substitute for Félix Torres in a 3–0 win against Bolivia in Cuenca.

Career statistics

Club

International

Honours
Ecuador U20
South American U-20 Championship: 2019
Individual
South American U-20 Championship Best XI: 2019

References

External links
Jackson Porozo profile at Federación Ecuatoriana de Fútbol 

2000 births
Living people
People from San Lorenzo, Ecuador
Ecuadorian footballers
Association football defenders
Ecuadorian Serie B players
Ligue 1 players
L.D.U. Quito footballers
Manta F.C. footballers
C.S.D. Independiente del Valle footballers
Santos FC players
Boavista F.C. players
ES Troyes AC players
Ecuador youth international footballers
Ecuador international footballers
Ecuadorian expatriate footballers
Ecuadorian expatriate sportspeople in Brazil
Ecuadorian expatriate sportspeople in Portugal
Ecuadorian expatriate sportspeople in France
Expatriate footballers in Brazil
Expatriate footballers in Portugal
Expatriate footballers in France
Ecuador under-20 international footballers
2022 FIFA World Cup players